South Huron is a municipality in the Canadian province of Ontario, located in the southern part of Huron County. It was formed by amalgamation of the townships of Stephen and Usborne with the Town of Exeter in 2001, in an Ontario-wide municipal restructuring imposed by the provincial government.

Communities
Communities in South Huron include:
 Centralia
 Crediton
 Dashwood
 Elimville
 Exeter
 Huron Park
 Kirkton
 Mount Carmel
 Shipka
 Winchelsea
 Woodham

Demographics

Transportation

The community is home to Centralia/James T. Field Memorial Aerodrome, a public airport and former British Commonwealth Air Training Plan base. The airport has no schedule airline service (closest is London International Airport), serving only private general aviation aircraft. The airfield host a company that modifies private jets.

Ontario Highway 4 is the main road serving South Huron, which connects with Ontario Highway 401 and Ontario Highway 402 in London, Ontario.

Services

Policing in South Huron served via Ontario Provincial Police Clinton Detachment.

South Huron Fire Department is a mix of full-time and volunteers at three fire stations.

Huron County EMS serves South Huron from their Exeter base.

See also
List of townships in Ontario

References

External links

Lower-tier municipalities in Ontario
Municipalities in Huron County, Ontario